Miguel Vila Ubach (born 1972)  is a Spanish equestrian jockey. He won the gold medal at the Individual endurance at the 2006 World Equestrian Games in Aachen, Germany in 2006.

References

External links

Spanish male equestrians
1972 births
Living people
Place of birth missing (living people)
Date of birth missing (living people)